Aleksandr Borisovich Kurdyumov (also transliterated Alexander Kurdumov; born November 26, 1967) is a member of the State Duma. He is a member of the LDPR and is Deputy Chairman of the State Duma's Committee on Duma Organization and Regulation.

References

External links 
 Official web page at the Russian State Duma 

1967 births
Living people
Liberal Democratic Party of Russia politicians
Fourth convocation members of the State Duma (Russian Federation)
Fifth convocation members of the State Duma (Russian Federation)
Sixth convocation members of the State Duma (Russian Federation)
Seventh convocation members of the State Duma (Russian Federation)